Rallina is a genus of bird in the rail family, Rallidae. It contains four species found in forest and marshland in Asia and Australasia. They are 18–34 cm long and mainly chestnut or brown, often with black and white markings. They are four species that are now placed in the genus Rallicula that were previously included in the genus Rallina. In fact, some taxonomic authorities continue to place them there. A fifth species, the Great Nicobar crake was proposed but not accepted as a separate species.

Species
The genus contains the following four species:

References

 
Bird genera
Taxa named by George Robert Gray
Taxonomy articles created by Polbot